MS Blue Carrier 1 is a ro-ro ferry built in 2000 for Norfolkline BV and now operates in the Aegean Sea for Blue Star Ferries.

History

Norfolk Line

The vessel was built at the Guangzhou Wenchong shipyard in China for Norfolk Line, originally being named Maersk Anglia. The vessel first operated on the Scheveningen to Felixstowe route until 2006 when it was moved onto the Vlaardingen to Felixstowe route. In 2009 the vessel was moved to the Irish Sea and deployed on the Heysham to Dublin route.

DFDS Seaways
In July 2010 the vessel was sold to DFDS Seaways and renamed Anglia Seaways - but remained on the Heysham to Dublin route.

In February 2011 the vessel was chartered to Seatruck Ferries and was deployed on the Heysham to Dublin route until 15 January 2012.

Then she was transferred over to the Immingham-Rotterdam route which she remained on until 30 April when the vessel was moved onto the Rosyth-Zeebrugge route.

In late May 2012 she was again chartered to Seatruck Ferries and operated on the Heysham-Warrenpoint route. In April 2014 the repainted ship operates for DFDS between Kiel and Kronstadt.

Attica Group
Following a May 2019 agreement between DFDS and Attica Group, the ship was sold to the latter for 12m euros. As of July 2019, she has been renamed Blue Carrier 1 and bears the Greek flag. It is expected to augment the ro-ro freight capacity of Attica Group in its Aegean sea routes.

Description
Blue Carrier 1 is a roll on-roll off freight ferry 142.5 metres in length capable of carrying 121 trailers or 1,680 lane metres.

References

External links

 dfdsgroup.com
 MV Anglia Seaways photos

Ships of Seatruck Ferries
2000 ships
Ships built in China
Merchant ships of Denmark
Ships of Blue Star Ferries